MatterHackers is an Orange County-based company founded in 2012 that supplies 3D printing materials and tools. MatterHackers is developing their 3D printer control software, MatterControl.

History
MatterHackers was founded in 2012, and provides both an online and physical, retail presence for customers. MatterHackers was an exhibitor at the World Maker Faire New York 2013. In 2014, MatterHackers was a sponsor of the 2014 3D Printer World EXPO, held in Burbank, California.

MatterControl

MatterControl is MatterHacker's software for 3D printers. "MatterControl is free software for organizing and managing 3D print jobs, with integrated slicing." MatterHackers has stated that while they may provide additional features as paid plug-ins, MatterControl at its core will remain free. MatterControl currently has a stable build that receives updates and patches from the development team. It has stable builds for Windows, Mac and Linux platforms. It is currently in a 2.0 beta for Windows phase. The beta includes several upgrades, including design capabilities, software 64-bit slicing and cloud storage for designs.

MatterControl Touch was launched in 2015. This is a product that is a 3D printer controller including onboard slicing, remote monitoring, and automatic print leveling. In 2016 MatterHackers launched and updated, and larger version of MatterControl Touch called MatterControl T10

Services

MatterHackers also supplies customers with 3D printing goods. In June 2013, MatterHackers opened their own retail location in Lake Forest, California where they sell 3D printing supplies, parts, and accessories. They currently produce their own 3D printer, the Pulse and the Pulse XE (which is designed to work specifically with Nylon and NylonX filament - but it can print all filaments.)

The shop also carries 3d printers made by:
 Ultimaker
 LulzBot
 SeeMeCNC
 BCN3D
MakeIt
MakerGear
Peopoly
Raise3D
Robo3D
Zortrax
Intamsys
FlashForge
CraftBot

Products

MatterHackers offers a variety of material selections, and filaments, but is known for their own PRO series brand. Materials carried include: 
 PRO Series PLA
 PRO Series ABS
PRO Series PETG
 NylonX
 PRO Series Nylon (Available in multiple colors)
ColorFabb
Fillamentum
NinjaTek
Taulman 3D
Kai Parthy's LAY Series
Ultimaker Materials
3D Fuel
PolyMaker
Proto-Pasta
3DXTech
Dupont
Raise3D Filaments

See also
 3D Printing

References

External links
 
 MatterControl website

Companies based in Lake Forest, California
American companies established in 2012
3D printing